West Virginia MetroNews is a radio network heard on many radio stations throughout the State of West Virginia.  The network is owned by the West Virginia Radio Corporation.  West Virginia MetroNews offers a mix of news and talk.   It held the rights to live play-by-play coverage of West Virginia University Mountaineers sports games, which it marketed under the DBA name "Mountaineer Sports Network", but lost these rights following the end of the 2012/13 basketball season.  The network also provides coverage of select high school football and basketball games that happen in West Virginia.

Availability
The network is carried on all West Virginia Radio Corporation owned stations, and is syndicated to stations in markets where WVRC does not do business.  Within a radio market, there is generally only one or two West Virginia MetroNews affiliates, which are almost always owned by the same company due to market exclusivity.

Programming

News
The company produces a traditional local news and weather update, designed to follow a national update, at the "top of the hour" for stations following a "full-service" format.

Morning News
"The Morning News" is all news program that updates the news of West Virginia, along with statewide weather and sports on a 22-minute cycle.  The show is hosted by anchors Chris Lawrence and Jennifer Smith.  This runs from 6-9 AM on weekdays.

Talkline
"Talkline" is a two-hour-long call in show featuring host Hoppy Kercheval, who generally takes a moderate to conservative take on most issues.  The show features local, state, and national guests along taking questions from callers throughout the state of West Virginia.   This show runs from 10-12 weekdays.

Hotline

Hotline is a mixed sports and general entertainment lifestyle discussion show hosted by Dave Weekley.  The program runs from 3-6 weekdays.

Sportsline
Sportsline is a one-hour-long weeknight program and a two-hour Sunday program that primarily discuses West Virginia University sports.  The program is hosted by Tony Caridi and Travis Jones.  It currently runs from 6-7 weekdays, and 6-8 on Sundays.

WV Outdoors
"WV Outdoors" is an outdoors program that focuses on fishing and hunting, though does delve into other sport topics.  The show is hosted by Chris Lawrence and runs 1 hour, from 7 to 8 on Saturday mornings.

High School Game Night
"High School Game Night" is a Wednesday and Friday 3 and 1/2 hour program that features live scores, interviews, and analysis of all the high school football games in progress throughout the state of West Virginia.  The show is hosted by Fred Persinger and Dave Jecklin.  The company also owns the rights to the WVSSAC playoffs.

Outdoors Today
"Outdoors Today" is a two-minute weekday report on the goings-on in West Virginia outdoors.  The segment is hosted by WV Outdoors host Chris Lawrence.

High school basketball
West Virginia MetroNews carries live coverage of select basketball games throughout the state of West Virginia, and holds the rights to the WVSSAC Tournaments.

Other ventures
The company formerly used the DBA "Mountaineer Sports Network" as the syndicator of WVU sports, but lost the rights following the 2013 basketball season and has dissolved the operation.  In the early 1990s it also briefly held rights to Virginia Tech and Marshall sports.

The company's television division produces and syndicates WVSSAC football and basketball tournament games, and previously syndicated WVU women's basketball games.

Affiliates
West Virginia MetroNews programs are carried on 57 different radio stations throughout the state of West Virginia, two stations in Kentucky, one station in Ohio, and one station in Virginia.

WAJR - Morgantown, West Virginia
WBKE - Fairmont, West Virginia
WBRB - Buckhannon, West Virginia
WBTQ - Weston, West Virginia
WCEF - Ripley, West Virginia
WCHS - Charleston, West Virginia
WCMI-FM - Catlettsburg, Kentucky
WCST - Berkeley Springs, West Virginia
WDBS - Sutton, West Virginia
WDGG - Ashland, Kentucky
WDMX - Vienna, West Virginia
WDNE - Elkins, West Virginia
WDNE-FM - Elkins, West Virginia
WEIR - Weirton, West Virginia
WELC - Welch, West Virginia
WEPM - Martinsburg, West Virginia
WETZ - New Martinsville, West Virginia
WFSP - Kingwood, West Virginia
WFSP-FM - Kingwood, West Virginia
WHAJ - Bluefield, West Virginia
WHIS - Bluefield, West Virginia
WJLS-FM - Beckley, West Virginia
WKAZ - Charleston, West Virginia
WKAZ-FM - Miami, West Virginia
WKLP - Keyser, West Virginia
WKMZ - Salem, West Virginia
WKQB - Welch, West Virginia
WKQR - Mullens, West Virginia
WKQV - Cowen, West Virginia
WKWS - Charleston, West Virginia
WLTF - Martinsburg, West Virginia
WMMN - Fairmont, West Virginia
WMOV - Ravenswood, West Virginia
WMRE - Charles Town, West Virginia
WNUS - Belpre, Ohio
WQWV - Fisher, West Virginia
WQZK-FM - Keyser, West Virginia
WRLF - Fairmont, West Virginia
WRON - Ronceverte, West Virginia
WRON-FM - Lewisburg, West Virginia
WRRL - Rainelle, West Virginia
WRVC - Huntington, West Virginia
WSGB - Sutton, West Virginia
WSWW - Charleston, West Virginia
WSWW-FM - Craigsville, West Virginia
WTZE - Tazewell, Virginia
WVAM - Parkersburg, West Virginia
WVAQ - Morgantown, West Virginia
WVAR - Richwood, West Virginia
WVLY - Moundsville, West Virginia
WVMR - Frost, West Virginia
WVOW - Logan, West Virginia
WVOW-FM - Logan, West Virginia
WVRC - Spencer, West Virginia
WVRC-FM - Spencer, West Virginia
WXDC - Berkeley Springs, West Virginia
WYKM - Rupert, West Virginia
WZAC-FM - Madison, West Virginia

References

External links
 West Virginia MetroNews

Companies based in West Virginia
American radio networks